Mount Macbain is a prominent mountain,  high, standing between the mouths of Cornwall Glacier and Helm Glacier in the Queen Elizabeth Range, Antarctica. It was named by the Advisory Committee on Antarctic Names for Commander Merle Macbain, U.S. Navy, Public Information Officer with the U.S. Naval Support Force, Antarctica, during U.S. Navy Operation Deep Freeze III and IV, 1957–58 and 1958–59.

See also
Fopay Peak

References

Mountains of the Ross Dependency
Shackleton Coast